James Anderson (8 August 1943 – 22 March 2003) was an Australian politician, elected as a member of the New South Wales Legislative Assembly.  He was the Labor Party member for St Marys from 1995 to 1999 and  Londonderry from 1999 to his death in 2003.

He had previously served as the Mayor of the City of Blacktown from 1991 to 1995, having already served as a councillor there from 1987.

Notes

 

1943 births
2003 deaths
Shire Presidents and Mayors of Blacktown
Members of the New South Wales Legislative Assembly
20th-century Australian politicians
21st-century Australian politicians